My Life as a Teenage Robot is an American animated superhero science fantasy television series created by Rob Renzetti. It was produced by Frederator Studios and Nickelodeon Animation Studio with Rough Draft Studios providing the animation services. Set in the fictional town of Tremorton, the series follows the adventures of a robot girl named XJ-9, or Jenny, as she prefers to be called, who attempts to juggle her duties of protecting Earth while trying to live a normal human life as a teenager.

A backdoor pilot for the series, entitled "My Neighbor Was a Teenage Robot", originally aired a segment of an episode of Oh Yeah! Cartoons on January 5, 1999. The series originally aired in the United States on Nickelodeon from August 1, 2003, to September 9, 2005. The third season aired in Asia from August 11, 2006, to March 30, 2007, and later in the United States from October 4, 2008, to May 2, 2009, on Nicktoons. A total of 40 episodes (75 segments) were produced over the course of 3 seasons. The entire series has been made available on DVD and digital purchase.

Series overview

Episodes

Backdoor pilot (1999)
A backdoor pilot for the series, entitled "My Neighbor Was a Teenage Robot", originally aired as a segment in an episode of the Nickelodeon series Oh Yeah! Cartoons on January 5, 1999.

Season 1 (2003–04)

Season 2 (2004–05)
Note: All episodes in this season were directed by Chris Sauve and Rob Renzetti, with the exceptions of "Escape from Cluster Prime", which was directed by Chris Savino and Rob Renzetti, and "Robot Riot", which was directed by John Fountain and Rob Renzetti.

Season 3 (2006–07)

Notes

References

External links
 
 

Lists of American children's animated television series episodes
Lists of Nickelodeon television series episodes